Almodóvar (from , al-mudawwar, "round, circular (place)") may refer to:

Places
 Almodôvar, Beja, Portugal
 Almodóvar del Campo, Ciudad Real, Spain
 Almodóvar del Pinar, Cuenca, Spain
 Almodóvar del Río, Córdoba, Spain
 Almodóvar Reservoir, Cádiz, Spain

People
 Pedro Almodóvar (b. 1949), a Spanish filmmaker
 Agustín Almodóvar (b. 1955), a Spanish film producer
 Melina Almodóvar, Puerto Rican salsa singer, songwriter, dancer, and entertainer

Other
 Duke of Almodóvar del Río, a Spanish nobility title